Masterfile is the second compilation album by Australian rock band, Icehouse. The album covers material from the band's first album Icehouse to 1986's Measure for Measure. It also features a re-recorded version of their 1981 single "Love In Motion" with Christina Amphlett of Divinyls.

Track listing 
 "Icehouse" - 4:21
 "Walls" - 4:22
 "Sister" - 3:25
 "We Can Get Together" - 3:46
 "Can't Help Myself" - 3:12
 "Great Southern Land" - 5:21
 "Street Cafe" - 4:14
 "Hey Little Girl" - 4:24
 "Dusty Pages" - 4:49
 "Don't Believe Anymore" - 5:16
 "Taking The Town" - 3:32
 "Mr. Big" - 3:32
 "Baby, You're So Strange" - 3:57
 "No Promises" - 4:40
 "Cross The Border" - 4:00
 "Love in Motion" (feat. Christina Amphlett) - 4:45

Bonus tracks on Australian release 
 "Crazy" - 4:49
 "Electric Blue" - 4:33
 "Man of Colours" - 5:11

Bonus tracks on Japanese release 
 "Byrralku Dhangudha" (feat. Buckethead)

Personnel 
Credits:
 Buckethead - guitar ("Byrralku Dhangudha")
 Christina Amphlett - vocal ("Love in Motion")
 Iva Davies - bass guitar, guitar, keyboards, programming, vocals, fairlight, linn drum
 Brian Eno - keyboards, vocals
 Keith Forsey - percussion
 Michael Hoste - keyboards
 Steve Jansen - drums
 Bob Kretschmer - guitar
 John Lloyd - drums
 Simon Lloyd - brass, reeds, overdubs
 David Lord - keyboards
 Guy Pratt - bass
 Andy Qunta - keyboards, vocals
 Anthony Smith - keyboards
 Masaki Tanasawa - drums
 Keith Welsh - bass

Charts

Certifications

References 

1992 compilation albums
Compilation albums by Australian artists
Icehouse (band) albums
Albums produced by Keith Forsey
Albums produced by Rhett Davies
Albums produced by Bill Laswell